, or simply LBX, is a series of action role-playing video games created by Level-5, involving small plastic model robots known as LBXs (standing for "Little Battler eXperience") that fight on dioramas made out of cardboard, with the main character setting out to battle against LBXs created by other characters. The first game of the series was released on June 16, 2011, for the PlayStation Portable and has expanded to six official games and three Japanese anime series. Nintendo published the first game for Nintendo 3DS in North America on August 21, 2015, Europe on September 4, 2015, and Australia on September 5, 2015.

Plot

AD 2046, technology has grown all over the world and innovation is leading the way. The way of delivery methods has changed since the creation of the super strong cardboard, which can resist every impact and keeping its contents intact. As the popularity of the material grew, so did its purposes. The super strong cardboard was used as material for special battlefields for LBX's, specialized miniature robots made by Tiny Orbit that were once banned due to their destructive purposes. Their popularity has again risen due to the specialized battlefield, and special models of LBX were made.

Four years after the creation of the super strong cardboard, in AD 2050, Ban Yamano (Van Yamano in the English dub), a male middle school student has been entrusted with the LBX "AX-00" by a mysterious woman, containing a Platinum Capsule. Ban learned from the woman that his father is still alive and knew about a secret conspiracy in the government. Ban himself must protect the LBX and the Platinum Capsule, as its contents could change the world forever.

Development 

Development of the franchise began in 2008 alongside the game which is once titled "LEVEL5 VISION 2008". In December 2009, Level-5 announced that the anime/manga series is under production to accompany the release of their latest PlayStation Portable game,  with Bandai releasing a series of plastic models featuring the mecha from the game. Although initially set for release in 2010, the anime is delayed a year later and aired on March 2, 2011, while the game is released on June 16, 2011.

Media

Anime

The first series, based on the first game, is produced by Oriental Light and Magic under the direction of Naohito Takahashi and began airing on TV Tokyo from March 2, 2011, to January 11, 2012, with a total of 44 Episodes. The sequel series,  was announced in late December, and aired between January 18, 2012, and March 20, 2013, with a total of 58 episodes. A third series titled  aired on TV Tokyo on April 3, 2013, to coincide with the third game's release. Wars would be the final season for the anime series and ended on December 25, 2013, with a total of 37 episodes.

Dentsu Entertainment USA confirmed that they have licensed the anime in the U.S, and began airing on Nicktoons from August 24, 2014. After the dub was aired in its entirety, it was revealed the series was abridged from 44 episodes to 26 episodes. Episodes with what was considered questionable content were merged with other episodes or in some cases skipped altogether. Because of the large difference in content, the list of dubbed episodes are listed under a new section called LBX: Little Battlers eXperience.

An adaptation of the sequel series, Little Battlers eXperience W, aired as the second season of LBX, premiering October 18, 2015 on Nicktoons.

During AnimeJapan 2019, LBX Girls (Sōkō Musume Senki) was announced by DMM Pictures as a new spinoff of the Little Battlers eXperience series and part of the Sōkō Musume multimedia project. The series aired from January 7 to March 25, 2021. Rikako Aida performs the series' opening theme "Dream Hopper", while Kano performs the series' ending theme "Compass Song". Funimation licensed the series and streamed it on its website in North America and the British Isles, in Europe through Wakanim, and in Australia and New Zealand through AnimeLab. An English dub of the series was released on January 19, 2022.

Movie

A movie adaptation was announced in the July issue of CoroCoro Comic titled Inazuma Eleven GO vs. Danbōru Senki W, which premiered in theaters on December 1, 2012.

Manga

A manga adaptation was serialized in Shogakukan's CoroCoro Comic from February 2011 to March 2013. It lasted for six volumes. In the US, it is distributed by Viz Media. Another manga adaptation, entitled , was written and illustrated by Hiroyuki Takei under the pen name Hiro was published in CoroCoro G. There is also a manga adaptation of Danball Senki Wars which is also serialized in CoroCoro Comic.

Music
The background music for the English version was composed by David Iris, John Mitchell and Tom Keenlyside. Michael and Andrew Twining wrote the closing theme songs "Battle On" (season 1) and "Save the World" (season 2).

The music for the anime was composed by Rei Kondoh, who also composed the soundtracks for the video games Ōkami and Sengoku Basara 3, among others.

The first anime series has four official theme songs. The first opening is titled  and the second opening is titled , both performed by Little Blue boX. The first ending song is titled   and the second ending is titled , both performed by Hiroki Maekawa.

Little Battlers eXperience W has eight official theme songs.

Little Battlers eXperience Wars has five official theme songs. The first opening is titled "Mugen Myself" and the second opening is titled "Eternal", both performed by Little Blue boX. The first ending song is "Kamisama Yāyāyā" performed by Dream5. The second ending song is "Bokutachi no Wars" performed by Ryota Ohsaka, Sayori Ishizuka, and Tomoaki Maeno. The third ending song is "Hirameki" performed by Ryota Ohsaka.

References

External links 
 Danball Senki official website
 Danball Senki at TV Tokyo
 
 
 
 

2011 anime television series debuts
2012 anime television series debuts
2014 anime television series debuts
2021 anime television series debuts
2011 video games
Anime television series based on video games
Japanese children's animated action television series
Japanese children's animated science fiction television series
Fiction set in 2046
Bandai brands
Children's manga
Hiroyuki Takei
Nicktoons (TV network) original programming
Nintendo games
Level-5 (company) games
Nintendo 3DS eShop games
Nintendo 3DS games
OLM, Inc.
PlayStation Portable games
PlayStation Vita games
Role-playing video games
Video games about robots
Manga based on video games
Shogakukan manga
Studio A-Cat
Tokyo MX original programming
Video games developed in Japan
Viz Media manga
Funimation
video games franchises introduced in 2008
Action role-playing video games by series